Fraize is a French commune.

Fraize or Fraise may also refer to:

People
 Gene Fraise (1932–2020), American politician
 Olivier Fraise (born 1970), French luger
 Peter Fraize, American saxophonist and George Washington University professor
 Franko Fraize, stage name of British rapper Frankie Dean

Other uses
 Canton of Fraize, a former French group of communes
 Fraise (1988–2005), an American Thoroughbred racehorse
 Fraise, a fork of the Mac OS X text editor Smultron